Taiwan Railway Bento are a type of ekiben (bento boxed meals) manufactured and distributed by the Taiwan Railways Administration at major railway stations and in train cars. It is estimated that, with five million boxed meals sold per annum, the annual revenue from bento distribution is 370 million NTD (approx. US$10 million).

History 
During the Japanese era, train passengers either dined at a dining car or opted for an ekiben. However, ekiben boxes were only available at stations, not in train cars.

Under the Chinese Nationalists' rule from 1945 onwards, a variety of private catering services sprang up as railway transportation gained popularity. These services were then integrated by the Taiwan Railway Administration in 1960, gradually shaping the major source of revenues of the administration other than transport itself.

On 9 Jun 2000, the pork chop bento, which had been discontinued for 32 years, reappeared in public on the Railways Festival. The originally-estimated one thousand boxes to be sold turned out to be a sales of over 90 thousand due to their popularity.

On 26 Feb 2015, Keikyu Corporation, a Japanese rail operator, sold Taiwan Railway Mealboxes as a promotional event.

Ingredients and distribution 

Although Taiwan Railway Bentos are primarily known for their pork chop and rice, they also contain a variety of side dishes, including braised eggs, dried tofu, pieces of dried white radish among others.

The Taiwan Railways Administration has established five catering zones at Songshan, Taipei, Taichung, Kaohsiung, and Hualien railway stations, where staff members of the TRA hand over mealboxes to car attendants for on-board distribution. During meal times (11:00-13:00 and 17:00-19:00), car attendants walk down the aisle of the train with a trolley, asking if there are passengers who would like a bento in Mandarin and Hokkien.

The containers were originally made of stainless steel, which were returned and washed after the contents had been consumed. However, due to exceedingly high costs and low return rates (passengers bringing the steel boxes home without permission), the administration now uses disposable paper boxes.

Railroad Bento Festival 
The first Formosa Railroad Bento Festival was set to take place from July 17 to 20, 2015.

See also
 Taiwanese cuisine
 List of pork dishes
 Bento
 Rail transport in Taiwan
 Taiwan Railways Administration
 Transportation in Taiwan

References

Bibliography

 
 
 

Taiwanese cuisine
Pork dishes
Taiwan Railways Administration
Bento